Mark Wylde is a fictional character from the British ITV soap opera, Emmerdale, played by Maxwell Caulfield. He made his first appearance on 15 January 2009 and departed on 14 January 2010.

In early December 2009, it was announced that Caulfield had quit the show and would depart shortly. Producers promised a "stunning exit storyline" which would see a who-dunnit type storyline in which Mark would be killed. Mark was murdered by his wife, Natasha Wylde, on-screen (although only the audience knew of Natasha's guilt) on 14 January 2010. The murder storyline saw the revelation of Mark and Faye's affair, that Mark was Ryan's biological father (meaning that he was Maisie's brother), and Natasha found out about Mark's cheating, giving them all motives for murder. The storyline reached its climax in mid-October, which saw Natasha confess to Mark's killing and sentenced to 21 years imprisonment and Ryan leaving the village for a fresh start.

Character creation and development

Casting
The characters of Mark and Natasha Wylde were announced in September 2008, with Maxwell Caulfield and Amanda Donohoe announced as the actors portraying them. They started filming in October 2008, and were originally thought to be first appearing on 25 December 2008, but this was later changed to 15 January 2009.

Caulfield said that the role was "just too tempting to turn down and I can't wait to start filming in the beautiful Yorkshire countryside".

Anita Turner, the series producer, said she was "thrilled to be welcoming two actors of such high calibre to the cast". He described the character as "fun to play".

Amanda Donohoe said that the Wyldes are "self-made millionaires, they're very well-to-do", and although not looking for retirement they do want a "break from the big city". She also said that the couple have been married for 25 years and have two grown-up children and a nine-year-old. Caulfield said that there is a "hidden side to Mark that will come out over time". Although he is an "out-and-out charmer" he is one of those people whose "sincerity you have to question", he said.

Departure and death
In October 2009 after less than a year in the show Caulfield quit the show due to fear of being typecast. it was announced that the character would be killed off and he made his last appearance on 14 January 2010.

Storylines
Mark and Natasha first appear on horseback riding into the village to meet Bishop George, who is waiting to hand over the keys of St. Mary's Church, which they have bought in addition to Home Farm. All three then head to The Woolpack, where they are given an unfriendly welcome, as their buying the church means Ashley and Laurel Thomas have to leave the village. However, Natasha announces that they bought the church and vicarage to give back to the community – making them instantly popular. However, Natasha had not discussed this with Mark before announcing it, but later assures him that it was necessary to keep the villagers on side.

A couple of months after the arrival of the Wyldes, Faye Lamb (Kim Thomson) turned up in the village after seeing Mark's photo in a magazine profile of the family. Mark saw her several times, and eventually they had a long conversation in the woods. He apologised for the way he treated her in the past and put her up in an expensive flat. In late May, it was revealed that Mark was married to Faye, making his marriage to Natasha bigamous, and his real name was Daniel Lamb. He went missing twenty-seven years ago, after going to pick up a friend from the station, and never returned. They were in serious debt as his company had just gone bankrupt. His parents never recovered from the shock and died shortly afterwards. Faye had Daniel declared legally dead seven years later. He moved to France and later set up a new identity – Mark Wylde. Faye was not sure if she was pregnant at the time and consequently did not tell him. A week later he found out that he and Faye had a son, Ryan Lamb (James Sutton).

In late June, Faye told Natasha everything about Mark's previous life, Natasha was very hurt and angry with Mark that she had been lied to for more than 20 years. Faye, angered by Mark and Natasha's behaviour, moved into the village with Ryan, wanting them to get to know each other. Natasha, however, insisted that Mark arrange a job for Ryan in Dubai, which he initially did but later withdrew only days before Ryan was due to leave, as he had bonded with Ryan. Natasha was not happy, warning Mark that it was only a matter of time before the truth came out.

In early January Mark and Faye were planning to get back together. Despite earlier plans, they decided to leave things as they were, aware of how much pain they would cause to their children. But Natasha guessed what Mark was doing and confronted them, just as they were making plans for Faye to move on. Faye told her this but Natasha refused to believe it, leading to a row. By this time Ryan and Maisie had started a secret relationship. However, while they are up in Ryan's bedroom they hear voices rowing downstairs, which they soon realise are Natasha, Mark and Faye. They come downstairs and announce that they are dating. Natasha, Mark and Faye explain that they cannot because they are half brother and sister and tell them that Mark is a bigamist. Both Ryan and Maisie are devastated and angry. After Natasha orders him to leave, Mark writes a suicide note that evening and goes out to the woods with a shotgun. Natasha finds the note and heads out to the woods and persuades him to give her the gun. But upon hearing him saying that he was not going to run away anymore, she shoots him with the shotgun and buries his body. His final words were, "I've made a decision. Let's go home." Natasha said in response, "You don't get to make decisions anymore, Mark..." before shooting him dead with the shotgun, killing him instantly. As the camera pans to the sky the gunshot can be heard. Natasha panics and she buries Mark's body, off-screen.

Almost six months later, Mark's body was discovered by Sam Dingle (James Hooton), who was walking his dog in woodland. Sam called the police, who identified the skeleton as that of Mark. Natasha played the devastated widow, claiming that she'd been away at the time Mark was murdered. Natasha and Nathan both framed Ryan Lamb (James Sutton) who was wrongfully charged with murder and wrongfully sentenced to life imprisonment. Maisie however proved that Ryan could not have killed Mark as he was with her, trying to come to terms that he'd just slept with Masie.

After her eldest son was confronted by Cain Dingle, (Jeff Hordley) who was hell-bent on exposing Mark's real killer, Natasha finally breaks down and confesses to the murder. She is arrested by Nick Henshall and placed into police custody to await sentencing. On 24 November 2010 Natasha was sentenced to life imprisonment with a minimum term of 21 years.

Reception
Prior to the Wyldes' first appearance, the News of the World described their arrival in the village as a "Don't miss" TV moment of the week. Simon Swift, in his Soaplife blog criticised Emmerdale for not being "more radical" in their new characters.

References

External links

Emmerdale characters
Fictional businesspeople
Fictional murdered people
Male characters in television
Television characters introduced in 2009